El Existential is a studio album by the American band Grupo Fantasma, released in 2010 through the record label Nat Geo Music. In 2011, the album earned the band the Grammy Award for Best Latin Rock, Alternative or Urban Album.

References

2010 albums
Grupo Fantasma (American band) albums
Grammy Award for Best Latin Rock, Urban or Alternative Album